Mahunwal is a small village in Nakodar.  Nakodar is a tehsil in the city of Jalandhar in the Indian state of Punjab.

About 
The nearest main road to Mahunwal is Nakodar-Nurmahal road which is almost half a km from the village. The nearest Railway station to this village is Nakodar Railway station. Mahunwal's STD code is 01821.

References

   A Punjabi website showing Mahunwal's Details

Villages in Jalandhar district
Villages in Nakodar tehsil